Maple is an unincorporated community in Red River County, Texas. It lies at an elevation of 377 feet (115 m).

References

Unincorporated communities in Texas
Unincorporated communities in Red River County, Texas